Tekever (Tekever, Tecnologias de Informação, SA) is an IT, aerospace, defence and security technologies company, based in Lisbon, Portugal. It was founded in 2001 by former students of the IST engineering school. From 2006, it initiated a process of internationalization, today having operating branches in the United Kingdom, USA, Brazil and China. It is also the leading company of several European technological joint-ventures.

Products
Tekever manufactures the following products:
 Tekever AR1 – autonomous unmanned aerial system (UAS) that delivers advanced information, security, surveillance, monitoring and reconnaissance capabilities;
Tekever AR3 – autonomous small unmanned aerial system (UAS), for maritime and medium range land missions;
 Tekever AR4 – mini-UAS, for intelligence, surveillance, target acquisition and reconnaissance missions;
 Tekever AR5 – tactical UAS for medium and long range maritime surveillance missions.
 Inter-Satellite Link (ISL)

Operators

Current operators 
:

 National Republican Guard: Tekever AR4 Light Ray
 Polícia de Segurança Pública: Tekever AR1 Blue Ray;
 Portuguese Navy: Tekever AR3 and Tekever AR4;
 Portuguese Army: Tekever AR4 during deployment in Kosovo.

:

 Ministry of Defence (United Kingdom): Tekever AR5.

:

 Brazilian Navy: Tekever AR2 Carcará

:

 Military Forces of Colombia.
:

 Indonesian National Board for Disaster Management: Tekever AR4.

:

 Nigerian Maritime Administration and Safety Agency: Tekever AR3.
Nigerian Navy: Tekever AR3.
:

 Senegalese Fishing Ministry: Tekever AR3.

 European Maritime Safety Agency: Tekever AR5.
 European Space Agency: Inter-Satellite Link (ISL)

Potential operators 
:

 Angolan Armed Forces.

References

Defence companies of Portugal
Technology companies of Portugal
Companies based in Lisbon
Unmanned aerial vehicle manufacturers